Kęstutis Kėvalas (17 February 1972 in Kaunas) is the current Archbishop of Kaunas.

Biography 
Kęstutis Kėvalas studied from 1990 to 1992 at Kaunas University of Technology. In 1993 he entered the Kaunas Priest Seminary, where he studied until 1997 Catholic theology and philosophy. He then continued his studies at the Seminary of St. Mary in Baltimore, where he earned a licentiate in theology. On 29 June 2000, he was ordained at the Cathedral Basilica of St Peter and St Paul.

From 2001 to 2005 he was the head of the Archdiocesan Seminary Propaedeuticum and diocesan youth minister. In 2003 Kevalas  started graduate doctoral studies in moral theology at Vytautas Magnus University in Kaunas, where he completed a doctorate in 2008. Kevalas was nominated the  Spiritual Priest of Kaunas Priest Seminary in 2005.

On 8 February 2010 he became the program director of Radio Maria in Lithuania.

On 27 September 2012 Pope Benedict XVI appointed him titular bishop of Abziri and auxiliary bishop of Kaunas, and he was ordained as bishop by Sigitas Tamkevičius, Archbishop of Kaunas (later created cardinal in 2019). On 20 April 2017 he was appointed as Coadjutor Bishop of Telšiai, then succeeded as bishop on 18 September.

On 19 February 2020 he was promoted as Archbishop of Kaunas. The ingress to the Cathedral Basilica of apostles St. Peter and St. Paul of Kaunas took place on 24 June 2020.

External links 

 http://www.catholic-hierarchy.org/bishop/bkevalas.html
 https://kaunoarkivyskupija.lt/arkiv-kk/

1972 births
Living people
21st-century Roman Catholic bishops in Lithuania
Archbishops of Kaunas
Kaunas University of Technology alumni
Academic staff of Vytautas Magnus University